"In a World Gone Mad" is an anti-war protest song released by the Beastie Boys. It was made available in March 2003 on the band's website in MP3 format as a free download. In its lyrics it directly references the war on terror and war on Iraq as well as political figures George W. Bush and Saddam Hussein.

The song was named the #26 "50 Worst Songs of the '00s" in a 2009 Village Voice article.

See also
List of anti-war songs

References

2003 songs
Beastie Boys songs
Protest songs
Opposition to the Iraq War
Songs written by Ad-Rock
Songs written by Mike D
Songs written by Adam Yauch